The Titanic Memorial is a granite statue in southwest Washington, D.C., that honors the men who gave their lives so that women and children might be saved during the RMS Titanic disaster. The thirteen-foot-tall figure is of a partly clad male figure with arms outstretched standing on a square base.  The base is flanked by a square exedra, created by Henry Bacon, that encloses a small raised platform. The statue was erected by the Women's Titanic Memorial Association.

The memorial sits at Fourth and P streets, SW, in Washington Channel Park next to the Washington Channel and Fort Lesley J. McNair.  It was designed by Gertrude Vanderbilt Whitney, who won the commission in open competition, and sculpted by John Horrigan from a single piece of red granite furnished from Westerly, Rhode Island, by the Henry C. Smalley Granite Co. It was unveiled May 26, 1931, by Helen Herron Taft, the widow of President Taft.

Originally located at the foot of New Hampshire Avenue, NW in Rock Creek Park along the Potomac River, the monument was removed in 1966 and placed into temporary storage to accommodate the Kennedy Center. The memorial was re-erected without ceremony in 1968 at its current location.

The French government purchased a replica of the head of the memorial, carved in marble, which it exhibited in Paris in 1921. Currently, this replica is housed in the Musée du Luxembourg.

Inscription
Front:
TO THE BRAVE MEN WHO PERISHED IN THE 
TITANIC
APRIL 15 1912
THEY GAVE THEIR
LIVES THAT WOMEN
AND CHILDREN
MIGHT BE SAVED

ERECTED BY THE
WOMEN OF AMERICA

Back:
TO THE YOUNG AND THE OLD
THE RICH AND THE POOR
THE IGNORANT AND THE LEARNED
ALL
WHO GAVE THEIR LIVES NOBLY
TO SAVE WOMEN AND CHILDREN

See also
 Butt–Millet Memorial Fountain
 List of public art in Washington, D.C., Ward 6
 "Women and children first"

References

External links

 Women's Titanic Memorial, Great Lakes Titanic Society
 Links to Photographs Showing Carving of the Women's Titanic Memorial, Quincy, Massachusetts Public Library
 Alternate design
 Photographs at dcmemorials.com
 Save Outdoor Sculpture Survey.

Monuments and memorials in Washington, D.C.
Outdoor sculptures in Washington, D.C.
Monuments and memorials on the National Register of Historic Places in Washington, D.C.
1931 sculptures
1931 establishments in Washington, D.C.
Statues in Washington, D.C.
Granite sculptures in Washington, D.C.
Sculptures of men in Washington, D.C.
RMS Titanic memorials
Southwest Waterfront